South Carolina Highway 130 (SC 130) is a  state highway in Oconee County, South Carolina, connecting Clemson and eastern Oconee County with access to Lake Keowee, Lake Jocassee, and the Blue Ridge Mountains.

Route description
SC 130 travels generally in a south–north direction, beginning at a major intersection with South Carolina Highway 59 in downtown Seneca.  SC 130 leaves downtown towards the east and intersects with Clemson Boulevard (US 76/US 123/SC 28). Traveling northward, the route becomes a two lane configuration and becomes more rural in character. SC 130 skirts the southern and eastern edges of Lake Keowee and provides beautiful views of the lake and the Blue Ridge Mountains. The route passes by several upscale lakefront communities and the old mill town of Newry. The route passes by the Oconee Nuclear Station prior to crossing Lake Keowee.

The route continues northward and passes through the small town of Salem before intersecting with the Cherokee Foothills Scenic Highway (SC 11). North of that intersection, the route becomes more windy as it enters the mountains and begins an uphill climb. Shortly before crossing into North Carolina, there are several overlooks offering attractive vistas of Lake Jocassee and the Upstate region. Upon crossing the state line, the route offers access to the Whitewater Falls recreation area. North of the state line, the route becomes North Carolina Highway 281 towards Lake Toxaway.

Major intersections

See also

References

External links

SC 130 at Virginia Highways' South Carolina Highways Annex

130
Transportation in Oconee County, South Carolina